Svetlana Ivanovna "Esfir" Dolzhenko-Krachevskaya (born November 23, 1944) is a Soviet athlete who competed mainly in the shot put.

She is Jewish, and was born in Shyroke, Odessa, Ukraine.  She competed for the Soviet Union in the 1980 Summer Olympics held in Moscow, Soviet Union in the shot put, where she won the silver medal.

Achievements

See also
List of select Jewish track and field athletes

References

1944 births
Living people
Soviet female shot putters
Ukrainian female shot putters
Olympic athletes of the Soviet Union
Athletes (track and field) at the 1972 Summer Olympics
Athletes (track and field) at the 1976 Summer Olympics
Athletes (track and field) at the 1980 Summer Olympics
Olympic silver medalists for the Soviet Union
Soviet Jews
Ukrainian Jews
Jewish female athletes (track and field)
Medalists at the 1980 Summer Olympics
Olympic silver medalists in athletics (track and field)
Sportspeople from Odesa